Sherman Township is a township in DeKalb County, in the U.S. state of Missouri.

Sherman Township was established in 1870, taking its name from William Tecumseh Sherman, an officer in the Civil War.

References

Townships in Missouri
Townships in DeKalb County, Missouri